Mark Owens may refer to:

 Mark Owens (North Dakota politician), member of the North Dakota House of Representatives
 Mark Owens (Oregon politician), member of the Oregon House of Representatives
 Mark Owens, American zoologist, co-author with Delia Owens of Cry of the Kalahari